Strange Blues is an album by American saxophonist Jackie McLean, recorded in 1957 and released on the Prestige label. It features three tracks with McLean in a quartet featuring pianist Jon Mayer, bassist Bill Salter and drummer Larry Ritchie, one with a quartet featuring pianist Mal Waldron, bassist Art Phipps and drummer Art Taylor and one with a quartet featuring pianist Gil Coggins, bassist Paul Chambers and drummer Louis Hayes. Trumpeter Webster Young and tuba player Ray Draper appear together on two tracks.

Reception
The AllMusic review by Scott Yanow stated: "a generally strong set chiefly recommended to Jackie McLean completists."

Track listing
All compositions by Jackie McLean, except as indicated
 "Strange Blues" - 7:32 
 "Millie's Pad" (Webster Young) - 11:15
 "What's New?" (Johnny Burke, Bob Haggart) - 6:35
 "Disciples Love Affair" (Ray Draper) - 6:49
 "Not So Strange Blues" - 4:49  
Recorded at Van Gelder Studio, Hackensack, New Jersey on February 15 (track 1), July 12 (tracks 2, 4 & 5) and August 30 (track 3), 1957

Personnel
Jackie McLean - alto saxophone
Webster Young - trumpet (tracks 2 & 4)
Ray Draper - tuba (tracks 2 & 4) 
Gil Coggins (track 3), Jon Mayer (tracks 2, 4 & 5), Mal Waldron (track 1) - piano
Paul Chambers (track 3), Art Phipps (track 1), Bill Salter (tracks 2, 4 & 5) - bass
Louis Hayes (track 3), Art Taylor (track 1), Larry Ritchie (tracks 2, 4 & 5) - drums

References

Prestige Records albums
Jackie McLean albums
1957 albums
Albums produced by Don Schlitten
Albums recorded at Van Gelder Studio